Frederick William Garnett (17 June 1817 – 4 April 1874) was an English first-class cricketer.

The son of Robert Garnett, he was born at Manchester in June 1817. He was educated at Eton College, before matriculating at Balliol College, Oxford in 1836, graduating B.A. in 1840, M.A. in 1845. While studying at Oxford, he made a single appearance in first-class cricket for Oxford University against the Marylebone Cricket Club at Oxford in 1840. Batting twice in the match, Garnett was dismissed for 10 runs in both of Oxford's innings' by James Cobbett. He was a student of the Inner Temple, but did not become a practicing barrister. Garnett died unmarried at Bonehill House in Tamworth in April 1874. His nephews, Charles and Lionel, were both first-class cricketers.

References

External links

1817 births
1874 deaths
Cricketers from Manchester
People educated at Eton College
Alumni of Balliol College, Oxford
English cricketers
Oxford University cricketers
Members of the Inner Temple